Senate elections were held in Pakistan on 6–10 March 2006. Half of the 100 seats in the Senate were up for election with the winning candidates serving six-year terms.

Results
Pakistan Muslim League (Q) 20 seats
Muttahida Majlis-e-Amal 10 seats
Independent 4 seats
Pakistan People's Party Parliamentarians 5 seats
Mutahidda Qaumi Movement 3 seats
Pakistan Muslim League (N) 1 seat
Pakhtunkhwa Milli Awami Party 1 seat
Pakistan Peoples Party 1 seat
Awami National Party 1 seats

References

Pakistan
2006 in Pakistan
Senate elections in Pakistan
2006 in Pakistani politics